Policie Modrava is a Czech crime drama television series which premiered on TV Nova in 2011.  The series was cancelled after the pilot aired on 9 October 2011 due to financial problems, but was renewed in 2012. The series premiered after four years on 1 March 2015. Soňa Norisová, Jaroslav Satoranský, Filip Tomsa and others appear in the main roles.

On 8 June 2015, TV Nova announced that it was preparing a second season, which was broadcast in autumn 2017.

The day after the final episode of the second season aired on 16 October 2017, it was announced that the series had been renewed for a third season. It was filmed in June 2018. The third season appeared on the screens in 2019 in the fall. The fourth season was filmed from the beginning of June to the end of October 2021and appeared on screens in autumn 2022.

The series was nominated for the Czech Lion 2016 in the category Best Dramatic TV Series, but did not win the award.

Plot 
Criminal investigator Jana Vinická  arrives in Kašperské Hory in Šumava to take up the vacant position of head of the local police department. From the beginning, she faces mistrust and unwelcomeness from her male subordinates. In each episode of the series, she solves a new criminal case Šumava.

Cast and characters 
 Soňa Norisová as kpt. Jana Vinická
 Jaroslav Satoranský as mjr. Václav Koutný
 Filip Tomsa as por. Kamil Sedláček
 Zdeněk Palusga as por. Vlasta Nováček
 Jan Monczka as npor. Karel Franc
 Matěj Dadák as ppor. Josef Vítek
 Jaroslava Stránská as stržm. Lucie Krásenská
 Michal Holán as por. Jarmil Votava
 Jiří Racek as Petr Mládek – police technician
 Matěj Anděl as Vojtěch Dvořák – police IT
 Jan Pohan as mjr. Ruda Racek
 Stanislav Hybler as the head of the forest administration Ing. Radek Hofman
 Martin Davídek as MUDr. Martin Beneš
 Petr Pelzer as medical examiner MUDr. Pavel Šedivý

References

External links 
 Official page
 

Czech crime television series
TV Nova (Czech TV channel) original programming
2011 Czech television series debuts